Yume Bitsu is the eponymously titled second studio album by Yume Bitsu, released on November 15, 1999 by Ba Da Bing Records.

Track listing

Personnel 
Adapted from the Yume Bitsu liner notes.

Yume Bitsu
 Jason Anderson – drums
 Alex Bundy – keyboards
 Adam Forkner – vocals, guitar, engineering
 Franz Prichard – guitar

Production and additional personnel
 Rick Duncan – production, engineering, mastering
 Joe Guest – photography
 Yume Bitsu – production

Release history

References

External links 
 Yume Bitsu at Discogs (list of releases)

1999 albums
Yume Bitsu albums
Ba Da Bing Records albums